Erwin Michalski (27 June 1912 – 29 March 1983) was a Polish footballer. He played in four matches for the Poland national football team in 1935.

References

External links
 

1912 births
1983 deaths
Polish footballers
Poland international footballers
Place of birth missing
Association footballers not categorized by position